Jablonná is a municipality and village in Příbram District in the Central Bohemian Region of the Czech Republic. It has about 400 inhabitants.

Administrative parts
The village of Horní Hbity is an administrative part of Jablonná.

References

Villages in Příbram District